You In-Tak (born January 10, 1958, in Gimje, Jeollabuk-do) is a retired South Korean freestyle wrestler and Olympic champion.

You first garnered attention at the 1981 Summer Universiade where he won the silver medal in the freestyle wrestling 68 kg class by losing to future two-time World Champion Raúl Cascaret of Cuba in the final match.

You received a gold medal at the 1984 Summer Olympics in Los Angeles.

Later he began coaching but he quit the sport in 1999 and since has been an owner of an eatery.

References

External links
 
 

1958 births
Living people
South Korean wrestlers
Olympic wrestlers of South Korea
Wrestlers at the 1984 Summer Olympics
South Korean male sport wrestlers
Olympic gold medalists for South Korea
Olympic medalists in wrestling
Asian Games medalists in wrestling
Wrestlers at the 1982 Asian Games
Medalists at the 1984 Summer Olympics
Universiade medalists in wrestling
Asian Games bronze medalists for South Korea
Medalists at the 1982 Asian Games
Universiade silver medalists for South Korea
Medalists at the 1981 Summer Universiade
People from Gimje
Sportspeople from North Jeolla Province
20th-century South Korean people
21st-century South Korean people